The Simeon Mills Historic District is located in Madison, Wisconsin.

History
During the 19th century, the area that is now the district featured a number of businesses owned by Simeon Mills. Mills was a member of the Wisconsin State Senate and was a key figure in establishing what would become the University of Wisconsin–Madison. The district was listed on the National Register of Historic Places in 1987 and on the State Register of Historic Places in 1989.

References

Historic districts on the National Register of Historic Places in Wisconsin
National Register of Historic Places in Madison, Wisconsin